The Herald is a nationwide mid-market tabloid newspaper headquartered in Dublin, Ireland, and published by Independent News & Media who are a subsidiary of Mediahuis. It is published Monday–Saturday. The newspaper was known as the Evening Herald until its name was changed in 2013.

History
The Evening Herald was first published in Dublin on 19 December 1891.

In 1982 the paper changed its size from broadsheet to tabloid.

Until November 2000, the Evening Herald was produced and pressed in Independent House on Middle Abbey Street, Dublin 1. The monochrome printing facility in the basement of this building was then retired, and the paper is now printed in full colour at a purpose-built plant in Citywest, along with the Irish Independent, the Sunday Independent and various other regional newspapers owned by Independent News & Media. In 2004, production of the paper was moved from Independent House to a new office on Talbot Street and the paper's old home was sold to the neighbouring department store, Arnotts, for an estimated €26 million.

The life of Herald music critic Chris Wasser was threatened by fans of boy band The Wanted in 2012 following the publication of his review of their gig in Dublin.

In March 2013, it was reported that the Evening Herald was to be renamed The Herald and would become a morning rather than an evening newspaper.

In March 2017, it was announced that INM were merging the Sunday World and The Herald newsrooms.

In October 2020, Independent News & Media announced that they would not longer be supporting the Herald website and would merge the Herald newsroom with the INM newsroom.

Herald AM

On 10 October 2005, a free version of the Evening Herald, published in the mornings and entitled Herald AM, began distribution, as a defensive measure against the Daily Mail and General Trust-owned Metro, launched on the same date. It joined with another morning freesheet Metro to become the Metro Herald. Herald AM later closed.

Circulation

In 2019, Independent News & Media exited the ABC auditing process. Hence, no circulation figures are available after 2018.

References

External links
 
 Reviews from the Evening Herald

 
1891 establishments in Ireland
Daily newspapers published in Ireland
Independent News & Media
Newspapers published in the Republic of Ireland
Publications established in 1891